Rhineland was a  cargo steamship that Howaldtswerke of Kiel, Germany built in 1938 for Argo Line, Bremen. She was requisitioned by the Kriegsmarine in 1939, and served as VP-101 Schwan, Sperrbrecher 31 and Sperrbrecher 131. She served post-war with the German Mine Sweeping Administration before being declared a prize and passed to British owners. She was renamed Weltonwold in 1948 and then Rhineland in 1949. She was sold to South African owners in 1956 and renamed Herrisbrook. She was renamed Inyoni in 1957 and scrapped in 1962.

Sister ships
Schwan was one of a series of sister ships that Argo Line had built in the late 1930s. In 1936 Howaldtswerke built Fasan ("Pheasant") and Nordseewerke in Emden built Möwe ("Seagull"). In 1938 Nordseewerke built Habicht ("Hawk"), Howardtswerke built Schwan ("Swan") and Lübecker Maschinenbau Gesellschaft built Adler ("Eagle").

Description

Like most of her sisters, Schwan was propelled by a two-cylinder compound steam engine plus a Bauer-Wach exhaust steam turbine. The exhaust turbine was coupled to the propeller shaft via an hydraulic coupling and double reduction gearing. Deschimag of Bremen, Germany built her engines. Her combined reciprocating and turbine machinery was rated at 222 NHP.

History
Howaldtswerke of Kiel, Germany, built Schwan for Argo Line, Bremen. Argo Line registered her in Bremen. Her call sign was DOUN.

On 12 September 1939 she was commissioned into the Kriegsmarine as the vorpostenboot VP-101 Schwan, serving with 1 Vorpostenbootflottille. On 1 October 1940, she was transferred to 3 Sperrbrecherflottille and renamed Sperrbrecher 31. She was renamed Sperrbrecher 131 on 15 July. Post-war, she served with the German Mine Sweeping Administration.

In 1947 Sperrbrecher 131 was declared a prize and passed to the UK. Laid up, she was sold to Atkinson & Pritchett, Hull, Yorkshire and renamed Weltonwold in December 1948, remaining laid up. Although reported as destroyed by a fire in 1949, she was repaired. She was sold to Currie Line, Leith, Lothian in 1949 and renamed Rhineland.

In 1956, Rhineland was sold to Smiths Coasters Pty Ltd, Durban, South Africa and was renamed Herrisbrook. She was renamed Inyoni in 1957. Her South African call sign was ZTML. She was scrapped at Durban in August 1962.

References

Bibliography

 

1938 ships
Ships built in Kiel
Merchant ships of Germany
Steamships of Germany
World War II merchant ships of Germany
Auxiliary ships of the Kriegsmarine
Minesweepers of the Kriegsmarine
Steamships of the United Kingdom
Merchant ships of the United Kingdom
Maritime incidents in 1949
Steamships of South Africa
Merchant ships of South Africa